Gilles Müller and Édouard Roger-Vasselin were the defending champions but Müller decided not to participate.

Roger-Vasselin played alongside Pierre-Hugues Herbert. They went on to win the title by defeating Arnaud Clément and Nicolas Renavand 6–0, 4–6, [10–7] in the final.

Seeds

Draw

Draw

References
 Main Draw

Trophee des Alpilles - Doubles
2011 Doubles